Murkoth Kunhappa was a bureaucrat and, later, a journalist. He was born on May 14, 1905, and was the eldest son of Moorkoth Kumaran, a popular Malayalam short story writer and social reformer. He was an associate editor of Malayala Manorama, a leading Malayalam daily newspaper, from 1966 until his death in 1993, during which he was a dominant presence in the cultural life of Kerala. Like his father, he was a follower of Sree Narayana Gurudevan. He produced many books, writing in English and Tamil as well as in Malayalam: they include Sree Narayana Guru (National Biography), Jivithasmaranakal (Reminiscences), a biography of Mammen Mappilai (the founder of Malayala Manorama) and an English-language children's book,  Three bags of gold and other Indian folk tales, which has attracted the interest of students of literature in several American universities. In 1990, he contributed Kalaripayyat to Crossovers: Explorations across Disciplines and Martial Arts, which was published in 1995 by Seagull Theatre Quarterly.

See also
Moorkoth Ramunni His brother and a disciple of Sree Narayana Guru.

References

External links
 The Hindu news. 
 Books of Kunhappa. 
 Sree Narayana Guru (Tamil)
 Moorkoth Kunhappa with Photo 

Narayana Guru
Malayali people
Indian male journalists
Journalists from Kerala
Indian film critics
Malayalam-language journalists
Recipients of the Kerala Sahitya Akademi Award